Jim Huber (August 28, 1944 – January 2, 2012) was an American sports commentator, writer, and essayist. He worked as a sports anchor for the former CNN Sports Illustrated, before joining Turner Sports in 2000.

Huber was raised in Ocala, Florida. He attended Presbyterian College, but graduated from Central Florida.  He began his career in sports journalism as a sportswriter for the Miami News and The Atlanta Journal. He joined WXIA in Atlanta, before moving to a relatively new cable news network called CNN. Huber was also Public Relations Director for the Atlanta Flames from 1972 until 1975.

Huber had a long history with the Turner Broadcasting Corporation. Huber first joined CNN in 1984, where he hosted a sports show called The Sporting Life With Jim Huber. He also contributed to CNN Sports Illustrated, a sister network of CNN, as an anchor and sports announcer. In 2000, Huber became a full-time on-air announcer and commentator for Turner Sports, which allowed him to cover both golf and the National Basketball Association (NBA) in greater depth. During the 1990s, Huber was awarded an Emmy for an essay, "Olympic Park Bombing", which he wrote and delivered in response to the 1996 Centennial Olympic Park bombing during the Atlanta Olympics.

Huber died in Atlanta, Georgia, on January 2, 2012, at the age of 67. He had recently been diagnosed with leukemia.

References

1944 births
2012 deaths
Emmy Award winners
American sports journalists
Sportswriters from Florida
American television sports anchors
American television sports announcers
CNN people
American essayists
Sportspeople from Ocala, Florida
College of Central Florida alumni
Presbyterian College alumni
Golf writers and broadcasters
National Basketball Association broadcasters
Atlanta Falcons announcers